William Laxton may refer to:
 William Laxton (surveyor) (1802–1854), British surveyor and author
 William Laxton (Lord Mayor of London) (1500s–1556), Lord Mayor of London during the reign of Henry VIII
 Bill Laxton (William Harry Laxton, born 1948), former Major League Baseball pitcher